The Psychiatrist may refer to:
 "The Psychiatrist" (Dynasty), an episode of Dynasty
 "The Psychiatrist" (Fawlty Towers), an episode of Fawlty Towers
 The Psychiatrist (journal)
 The Psychiatrist (TV series)
 O alienista or The Psychiatrist, a novella by Machado de Assis

See also
 Psychiatrist (disambiguation)